Donet Dominic Graves, Jr. is an American political advisor and government official who is the current Deputy Secretary of Commerce in the Biden Administration. Graves formerly led the Beau Biden Cancer Moonshot and served in multiple roles within the Obama Administration, including as an advisor to then-Vice President Joe Biden.

Early life and education 
Graves grew up on the East Side of Cleveland, Ohio. Graves earned a Bachelor of Arts degree in political science and history from Williams College and a Juris Doctor from the Georgetown University Law Center.

Career 
From 1995 to 1997, Graves was the vice president and Washington, D.C. office director of New Equality. From 1997 to 1999, Graves was a policy advisor in the United States Department of the Treasury. From 1999 to 2005, he was the policy director of Business Roundtable. He was a founding partner at Graves & Horton, LLC, a legal services firm.

During the presidency of Barack Obama, Graves served as the executive director of the President's Council on Jobs and Competitiveness and led the federal government’s efforts in the economic recovery of the city of Detroit. After the council disbanded, Graves served as Counselor and Domestic and Economic Policy Director to Vice President Joe Biden. 

Graves also served as Deputy Assistant Secretary for Small Business, Community Development, and Housing Policy at the Department of the Treasury, where he oversaw the CDFI Fund, the $4 billion Small Business Lending Fund, and the $1.5 billion State Small Business Credit Initiative. He was also the U.S. Federal Representative to the G7 Task Force on Social Impact Investment. 

In 2016, Biden chose Graves to lead the Beau Biden Cancer Moonshot. After the Obama administration, Graves worked as the head of corporate responsibility and community relations and senior director of corporate community initiatives and relations at KeyBank.

Deputy Secretary of Commerce 
In January 2021, President-elect Biden announced that he will nominate Graves to be United States Deputy Secretary of Commerce. Graves was confirmed by the US Senate by a vote of 89–7 on May 13, 2021. He was sworn in the next day.

References

External links 

Living people
United States Deputy Secretaries of Commerce
Biden administration personnel
Obama administration personnel
Georgetown University Law Center alumni
Williams College alumni
African-American government officials
Year of birth missing (living people)